Marco Alfonso Grimalt Krogh (born 11 July 1989) is a Chilean Olympic volleyball player.

He represented Chile at the 2020 Summer Olympics.

Notes

References

External links 
 
 
 
 

1989 births
Living people
Chilean beach volleyball players
Olympic beach volleyball players of Chile
Beach volleyball players at the 2016 Summer Olympics
Pan American Games gold medalists for Chile
South American Games bronze medalists for Chile
South American Games medalists in volleyball
Competitors at the 2014 South American Games
Competitors at the 2018 South American Games
Beach volleyball players at the 2011 Pan American Games
Beach volleyball players at the 2015 Pan American Games
Pan American Games medalists in volleyball
Beach volleyball players at the 2019 Pan American Games
Medalists at the 2019 Pan American Games
Beach volleyball players at the 2020 Summer Olympics
21st-century Chilean people